Essex Savings Bank is a bank headquartered in Essex, Connecticut, United States. It operates 6 branches, all of which are in Connecticut. The company also operates a trust department and has 22 financial advisors with $3.4 billion of assets under management.

The bank donates 10% of its net profits to local charitable organizations.

History
The bank was founded on August 6, 1851, by a group of shipmasters, businessmen, and entrepreneurs.

The bank's branch served as a gathering place for many skippers who met there between voyages to discuss their adventures.

The first bank president was Henry L. Champlin, a sea captain.

In 2015, John W. Rafal, the founder of the financial services division, was fired after he paid a referral fee in violation of regulations.

References

Banks based in Connecticut
Banks established in 1851
1851 establishments in Connecticut